Kinga Grzyb, née Polenz (born 12 January 1982) is a Polish handball player for Zagłębie Lubin.

She represented Poland at the 2013 World Women's Handball Championship in Serbia.

International honours 
Carpathian Trophy:
Winner: 2017

References

External links

Player profile at the Polish Handball Association website 

Polish female handball players
1982 births
Living people
People from Elbląg
21st-century Polish women